The Steele Cup Cash is an annual bonspiel, or curling tournament, held at the Capital Winter Club in Fredericton, New Brunswick. It was part of the Men's and Women's World Curling Tour in 2018 and 2019, and is now just a tour event. The tournament is held in a round robin format.

Past champions

Men

Women

References

World Curling Tour events
Women's World Curling Tour events
Curling competitions in Fredericton
2017 establishments in New Brunswick